Landmark Life Plaza is a shopping mall in Bade District, Taoyuan, Taiwan that opened on January 12, 2017 as Kwong Fong Plaza (廣豐新天地).

History
 The shopping mall obtained a construction license in the second semester of 2013. 
 Construction began in 2014 and completed in 2016. 
 It opened for trial operation on December 22 of 2016.
 The mall officially opened on January 12, 2017.
 In November 2021, the mall changed its name to Landmark Life Plaza after being bought by Cathay Life Insurance.

Floor Guide
 Levels 5 - 6: Children's Art Museum, Taoyuan
 Level 3: Themed shops
 Level 2: Parking spaces
 Level 1: Kwong Fong Avenue
 Level B1: Parking spaces
 Level B2: Carrefour store
 Levels B3 & B4: Parking spaces

Gallery

See also
 List of tourist attractions in Taiwan

References

External links

2017 establishments in Taiwan
Shopping malls in Taoyuan
Shopping malls established in 2017